Hyalopterus is a genus of true bugs belonging to the family Aphididae.

The species of this genus are found in Eurasia and Northern America.

Species:
 Hyalopterus amygdali (Blanchard, 1840)
 Hyalopterus arundiniformis Ghulamullah, 1942
 Hyalopterus pruni (Geoffroy, 1762)

References

Aphididae